South Carolina Highway 105 (SC 105) is a  state highway in the U.S. state of South Carolina. The highway connects rural areas of Union and Cherokee counties.

Route description
SC 105 begins at an intersection with SC 49 (Lockhart Highway) south of Robat, in rural parts of northeastern Union County. It travels to the north and almost immediately intersects SC 9 (Jonesville–Lockhart Highway). The highway gradually moves to a more westerly routing, while still traveling north. It crosses over the Pacolet River on an unnamed bridge, where it enters Cherokee County. In Saratt, it intersects SC 211 (Gowdeysville Road). The two highways travel concurrently to the east-northeast. They split in a rural area, with SC 105 traveling to the north-northwest. It goes through Wilkinsville and intersects SC 329 (Victory Trail Road). In the southern part of Gaffney, the highway begins a concurrency with SC 18 (Frederick Street) near Limestone College. It turns left onto Union Street, and follows that road until it meets College Drive. Then, it turns right, before turning left onto East Rutledge Avenue. It then turns left onto SC 150 (South Limestone Street). The two highways split when SC 105 turns right onto Corry Street. It then intersects U.S. Route 29 (US 29; Old Georgia Highway/South Granard Street). After a temporary departure from the city limits, where the highway passes a Freightliner plant, it meets its northern terminus, an interchange with Interstate 85. Here, the roadway continues as Hyatt Street.

Both are not signed with these special route numbers though the connector near Draytonville is signed as mainline southbound SC 105.

History

South Carolina Highway 103

South Carolina Highway 103 (SC 103) was a state highway that was established in December 1937 from SC 11 (now SC 18) in Gaffney to what is now SC 329 southeast of the city. In 1939, its northern terminus was extended through Gaffney to the North Carolina state line north-northwest of the city. Its southern terminus was also extended to just west of the Broad River, at an intersection with the northern terminus of SC 114. The next year, its northern terminus was truncated to SC 18 in Gaffney. Its former path was redesignated as SC 150. In 1947, SC 103 was decommissioned; most of its path was redesignated as SC 105.

Major intersections

Special routes

Saratt connector route

South Carolina Highway 105 Connector (SC 105 Conn.) is a  connector route between SC 105 and SC 211 in Saratt, which is in the southern part of Cherokee County. SC 105, SC 105 Conn., and SC 211 come together in a triangle shape. It is an unsigned highway.

The connector begins at an intersection with SC 211. It travels to the east-northeast. It curves to the southeast and reaches its eastern terminus, an intersection with the SC 105 mainline.

Cherokee County connector route

South Carolina Highway 105 Connector (SC 105 Conn.) is a  connector route that bypasses the intersection between SC 105 and SC 329 to the southwest. It is located in a rural portion of Cherokee County, at a point south-southeast of Draytonville. It is an unsigned highway.

The connector begins at an intersection with the SC 105 mainline. It travels to the west-northwest and immediately curves to the northwest. It curves to the north-northeast just before reaching its northern terminus, a second intersection with SC 105.

See also

References

External links

SC 105 South Carolina Highway Annex

105
Transportation in Union County, South Carolina
Transportation in Cherokee County, South Carolina
Gaffney, South Carolina